Jacob Young (born 6 March 2000), is an Australian professional footballer who plays as a defender for Perth Glory.

Club career

Perth Glory
On 2 February 2022, following a shortage of players due to COVID-19, Young was signed by Perth Glory on a short-term contract until the end of the 2021–22 A-League Men season and made his debut on the same day in a 1–0 loss to Western Sydney Wanderers. After making two A-League Men appearances and impressing in 11 appearances for the academy side in the NPL WA, Young signed a one year scholarship with the club for the 2022–23 A-League Men season.

Personal life
Jacob is the son of former professional footballers Stuart Young.

References

External links

2000 births
Living people
Australian soccer players
Association football defenders
Sunderland A.F.C. players
TSG 1899 Hoffenheim II players
Perth Glory FC players
National Premier Leagues players
A-League Men players